Alan Stout may refer to:

 Alan Stout (philosopher) (1900–1983), British moral philosopher working at the University of Sydney
 Alan Stout (composer) (1932–2018), American composer of contemporary classical music

See also
 Stout (surname)